Lewis "Lew" Morton is an American television writer. He has written for several shows, including Saturday Night Live (from 1993-1995), NewsRadio, Family Guy and Futurama. He worked as a producer for Undeclared, but never authored any episodes. He also executive produced the film Walk Hard: The Dewey Cox Story.
During his time on Futurama Lewis wrote twelve episodes, making him and writer Ken Keeler the two writers who wrote the most episodes on that show as well as the most known.

Lewis also went to the same primary school as David X. Cohen.  Morton also attended Harvard University, where he worked on The Harvard Lampoon.

Awards 
2011 Primetime Emmy Award for Outstanding Animated Program (for Programming Less Than One Hour) on Futurama.

2002 Primetime Emmy Award for Outstanding Animated Program (for Programming Less Than One Hour) on Futurama.

Nominated
2001 Emmy for Outstanding Animated Program on Futurama.

1999 Emmy for Outstanding Animated Program on Futurama.

Writing credits

NewsRadio episodes 
"Massage Chair"

Futurama episodes 
"A Big Piece of Garbage"
"Fry and the Slurm Factory"
"Brannigan, Begin Again"
"Raging Bender"
"Mother's Day"
"Amazon Women in the Mood"
"The Cyber House Rules"
"Anthology of Interest II" (with David X. Cohen, Jason Gorbett, Scott Kirby)
"Bender Should Not Be Allowed on TV"
"The Late Philip J. Fry"
 "Calculon 2.0"
 "Murder on the Planet Express"

Family Guy episodes 
"Encyclopedia Griffin"
"The Heartbreak Dog"

References

External links 

 The New York Times Movies

Year of birth missing (living people)
Living people
American television writers
American male television writers
Place of birth missing (living people)
The Harvard Lampoon alumni